Microvirga is a genus of bacteria from the family of Methylobacteriaceae.

References

Hyphomicrobiales
Bacteria genera